Graeme Robert McDougall (born 21 November 1946) is an Australian politician and businessman. He was a member of the House of Representatives from 1996 to 1998, representing the Queensland seat of Griffith for the Liberal Party. He also served on Brisbane City Council.

Early life
McDougall was born on 21 November 1946 in Taree, New South Wales. He holds an associate diploma in business management from East Sydney Technical College. Prior to entering politics he was a senior manager in the plastics industry and later ran a hardware store.

Politics
McDougall served on the Brisbane City Council from 1988 to 1996. He was chairman of the organising committee for the 1988 FINA World Masters Championships which Brisbane hosted.

At the 1993 federal election, McDougall served as chair of the Liberal Party's campaign committee in Queensland. He was elected to the House of Representatives at the 1996 election, winning the seat of Griffith for the Liberals.  Although the retiring Labor MP, Ben Humphreys, had held it without serious difficulty since 1977, the recent redistribution had cut Labor's majority almost in half, to a somewhat marginal four percent.  Additionally, Labor was very unpopular in Queensland.  McDougall defeated Labor candidate Kevin Rudd on the eighth count, largely due to getting a large flow of National preferences on the seventh count.  Labor was cut down to only two seats in the state, its worst showing there since 1975. Rudd, who would later go on to become leader of the Australian Labor Party and eventually prime minister, successfully re-contested Griffith in the 1998 election.

References

1946 births
Living people
Liberal Party of Australia members of the Parliament of Australia
Members of the Australian House of Representatives for Griffith
Queensland local councillors
20th-century Australian politicians